Clifford Charles Wendehack was an American architect noted for the design of clubhouses at country clubs.

Wendehack was most active during the 1920s. Most notably, he designed the clubhouses at Mountain Ridge Country Club, Winged Foot, Bethpage, Norwood, Ridgewood, Forsgate, Douglaston Park (for North Hills Country Club), The Park Country Club, The Pennhills Club (Bradford, PA), The Caracas Country Club, and Hackensack Golf Club, Oradell, NJ.

Wendehack's influence in the design of clubhouses was enhanced by his publications.  He was a key contributor to the March 1925 edition of Architectural Forum magazine, the Golf and Country Club Reference Number.  This extensive review of the planning and design of clubhouses included an article by Wendehack 'Developing the Country Club Plan' which gives a strong insight into his planning and design philosophy.  The issue is illustrated with extensive examples of clubhouse architecture and interior design, including a number of Wendehack's projects.

Wendehack expanded on this in his 1929 work 'Golf and Country Clubs', a detailed hardcover publication illustrated with 55 clubhouse designs.  This was the most comprehensive work on clubhouses until Richard Diedrich's 2008 'The Ninenteenth Hole', a work which extensively references Wendehack's writings.  This was followed up in March 1930 with an important contribution to another Architectural Forum Reference Number on Clubhouses, 'The Architect and the Building Committee'.

Wendehack also designed the Fleetwood Hills Apartments in Bronxville, New York. Floorplans for some of the units are on page 734  in the March, 1927 issue of The Architect.

American architects